Dimitris "Jimmy" Patikas (Greek: Δημήτρης "Τζίμης" Πατίκας) is a former Australian football player. Renowned for his exceptional speed and for being the first established Australian player to be signed by a professional European football club, he was capped 27 times for the Socceroos and played as a forward and midfielder for Sydney City, Sydney Olympic, Sydney Croatia, AEK Athens, Athinaikos and Kastoria.

Career 
Patikas represented the Young Socceroos in both the 1981 FIFA World Youth Cup in Sydney and 1983 World Youth Cup in Mexico. Despite being one of the youngest players in the 1981 World Youth Cup, Patikas had already played over two seasons for NSL Champions Sydney City debuting as a 15-year-old in the 1979 season. He was therefore a key part of the Australian squad that reached the Quarter Finals in 1981, losing 1-0 only to eventual winners, Germany. His performances for the Young Socceroos and Sydney City earned Patikas his first full international cap aged only 17 against Indonesia in 1981 World Cup Qualifying and a contract with a Sir Alex Ferguson coached Aberdeen.
 
In 1983, after five seasons and three NSL Championships with Sydney City, Patikas was signed by Tommy Docherty at Sydney Olympic. In his first season at Olympic, he won the NSL Cup and held the record for most Young Socceroos international appearances after playing in his second FIFA World Youth Cup in Mexico. Against European Youth Champions Scotland, Patikas scored a goal with 3 minutes remaining to give the Young Socceroos a 2-1 victory elevating them to the top of Group A. In the final round, a 2-1 defeat to Korea Republic saw the Young Socceroos exit the tournament with only one defeat. However, the performances of Patikas attracted the attention of many international scouts. One including newly appointed Barcelona F.C. coach Cesar Luis Menotti. According to media reports, Patikas was offered a contract by Menotti, but injury forced him to return to Australia.

In 1985, Patikas joined Olympics' rivals Sydney Croatia and scored two goals against his former club on his way to the Player of the Year and top goal scorer titles. He played 13 of his 27 caps during this season, and was a key member of the Socceroos' 1986 World Cup Qualifying matches against a Scottish national side featuring Gordon Strachan, Alex McLeish and Graeme Souness. Patikas who had experience in Scotland during his time at Aberdeen was one of the Socceroos' stand-out performers in a 2-0 aggregate loss. Following these games, he was signed by Greek club AEK Athens. In March 1988, Patikas returned to Australia to represent the Socceroos in the Olympic qualifiers becoming the first player to turn out for the Socceroos while based at a non-Australian club. In his first game back he scored the winner for the Socceroos against Chinese Taipei. The next match against New Zealand saw Patikas become the first Australian goal scorer at the Sydney Football Stadium when opening the scoring in a 3-1 win.

In his fourth season at AEK, Patikas won the league title ending the club's ten year championship drought. He went on to make over 200 appearances for AEK in all competitions (including European Cup / UEFA Champions League and UEFA Cup) scoring 58 goals. He won 3 Greek Championships, 1 Greek League Cup, 1 Greek Super Cup and 1 Pre-1991 Mediterranean Games Cup.

After nearly a decade with AEK Athens, Patikas signed for Athinaikos during the 1993 season. In his first game back at Nikos Goumas Stadium, he scored against his old club, AEK. Despite being man-of-the-match, he ended up on the losing side as the Greek champions won 3-2.

In 1995, Patikas signed for Northern Greek outfit Kastoria in Gamma Ethniki. The club was promoted into Beta Ethniki, and Patikas helped the club gain promotion into the Greek First Division for the first time since 1983. Following a successful period at Kastoria, Patikas returned home to play for Sydney United and Sydney Olympic in the NSL.

Honours

Player

 Sydney City
 NSL Championship: 1980, 1981, 1982

Sydney Olympic
 NSL Cup: 1983

AEK Athens
 Greek Championship: 1989, 1992, 1993
 Greek League Cup: 1990
 Greek Super Cup: 1989
 Pre-1991 Mediterranean Games Cup: 1991

Individual
 Australian Player of the Year: 1985 with Sydney Croatia
 Top goal scorer: 1985 with Sydney Croatia
 NSW Player of the Year: 1985 with Sydney Croatia
 Greek League MVP Team: 1986/87 & 1989/90 with AEK Athens
 1st Socceroo to play in the UEFA Champions League (AEK Athens)
 1st player to represent Socceroos while based at a non-Australian club 
 1st Australian goal scorer at the Sydney Football Stadium
 5th Youngest Socceroos debutant (Sydney City)  
 4th Youngest NSL debutant (Sydney City)

References

External links
 Jim Patikas Interview
 Patikas: 'I played table tennis with Fergie'

1963 births
Living people
Australian soccer players
Australian expatriate soccer players
Australia international soccer players
Australia B international soccer players
Association football midfielders
Super League Greece players
Hakoah Sydney City East FC players
AEK Athens F.C. players
Kastoria F.C. players
Athinaikos F.C. players
Australian people of Greek descent
Naturalized citizens of Greece